Collins Creek is a tributary of Mill Creek in Luzerne County, Pennsylvania, in the United States. The creek has no named tributaries, but several drainage ditches flow into it. It is a Coldwater Fishery and is not impaired. The creek is one source of flooding in Pittston Township.

Course
Collins Creek begins near the base of a hill in Pittston Township. It flows north for a short distance before turning northwest for several tenths of a mile. It then turns west before turning southwest and then west again. Several tenths of a mile further downstream, the creek enters Dupont and turns southwest for a few tenths of a mile, reentering Pittston Township. It then turns west-southwest for several tenths of a mile before reaching its confluence with Mill Creek.

Tributaries
Collins Creek has no named tributaries. However, a number of drainage ditches lead into the creek.

Hydrology
Collins Creek is not considered to be impaired. Pittston Township and the borough of Dupont have permits to discharge stormwater into the creek.

The peak annual discharge of Collins Creek at its mouth has a 10 percent chance of reaching 230 cubic feet per second. It has a 2 percent chance of reaching 390 cubic feet per second and a 1 percent chance of reaching 470 cubic feet per second. It has a 0.2 percent chance of reaching 680 cubic feet per second.

The peak annual discharge of Collins Creek at the border between Pittston Township and Dupont has a 10 percent chance of reaching 200 cubic feet per second. It has a 2 percent chance of reaching 340 cubic feet per second and a 1 percent chance of reaching 400 cubic feet per second. It has a 0.2 percent chance of reaching 580 cubic feet per second.

The discharge of Collins Creek was measured several times in the middle of the 20th century. The values ranged from 0.10 to 3.70 cubic feet per second.

Geography and geology

The headwaters of Collins Creek are on a ridge near the Wilkes-Barre Scranton International Airport. It also passes by the International Trade Zone Industrial Park and loses water to a mine pool, as does the nearby Lidy Creek.

Watershed and biology
The stream is entirely within the United States Geological Survey quadrangle of Avoca. The creek is one of the main tributaries of Mill Creek. Its watershed is "high quality" and mountainous (as is the case with Collins Creek). According to the Lackawanna River Watershed Conservation Plan, the creek's location on United States Geological Survey quadrangle maps is erroneous.

Collins Creek is designated as a Coldwater Fishery. There is a stream site operated by the United States Geological Survey on the creek in Dupont.

Collins Creek is a source of flooding in Pittston Township.

History
Collins Creek was entered into the Geographic Names Information System on August 2, 1979. Its identifier in the Geographic Names Information System is 1172217.

A storm in 1955 caused high waters on Collins Creek. However, there was little flooding in Pittston Township during that storm. In 1990, a tanker truck spilled 8000 gallons of gasoline in the area, causing emergency operations to be performed in the watershed of the creek. In 2002, the replacement of a bridge carrying Interstate 81 over the creek in Dupont was authorized for $1,100,000. Collins Creek and Lidy Creek were subjected to a restoration project that was approved in 2007. It was carried out by Sikora Brothers Paving Co. for $46,709. The Federal Emergency Management Agency funded $45,000.

See also
Lidy Creek, next tributary of Mill Creek going downstream
List of rivers of Pennsylvania
List of tributaries of the Lackawanna River

References

Rivers of Luzerne County, Pennsylvania
Tributaries of the Lackawanna River
Rivers of Pennsylvania